Biyi Alo (born 16 March 1994) is an English professional rugby union player who plays for Racing 92 in the Top 14. Alo has also released two hip-hop songs, under the name 'Biyi'.

Club career

Alo came through the academy ranks of Saracens and during this period he spent time on loan at Bedford Blues. He was a member of the Sarries side that defeated Exeter Chiefs to win the 2015 Anglo-Welsh Cup. The following year saw him leave for Worcester Warriors. After making thirty first-team appearances for Worcester a move to French club Soyaux Angouleme was agreed in 2018 however the transfer ultimately didn’t materialise and due to health reasons he took a break from rugby.

Alo returned to professional rugby at Coventry who he joined in October 2018. After a short spell at the club he was scouted by Wasps and initially joined as injury cover, making his club debut against Leicester Tigers on 2 March 2019 with the deal being made permanent three days later. Alo was a second-half replacement for Jeffery Toomaga-Allen in the 2020 Premiership Final as Wasps finished runners up to Exeter.

Wasps entered administration on 17 October 2022 and Alo was made redundant along with all other players and coaching staff. After made redundant from Wasps, Alo signed for top French club Racing 92 for the rest of the 2022-23 season.

International career
Alo was a member of the England under-20 team that won the 2014 IRB Junior World Championship and was on the bench for the final against South Africa at Eden Park. In June 2022 he was called up by Eddie Jones to join a training camp with the senior England squad.

References

External links
European Professional Club Rugby Profile
Wasps Profile

1994 births
Living people
English rugby union players
Coventry R.F.C. players
Saracens F.C. players
Wasps RFC players
Worcester Warriors players
Rugby union props
Black British sportspeople
English people of Nigerian descent